Sin Huat Eating House is a restaurant located in Geylang, Singapore. It is run by Danny Lee and primarily serves seafood dishes, including crab bee hoon.

Description
Sin Huat Eating House is located in Geylang, Singapore. The restaurant primarily serves seafood dishes, including crab bee hoon (crab with rice vermicelli), poached gong gong, and frog legs. There is also a braised duck rice stall within the premises.

Reception
Anthony Bourdain described the restaurant's premises as a "sweltering dump open to the street and the prostitutes of Geylang", but listed it as one of the "13 Places to Eat Before You Die". Singaporean food critic KF Seetoh wrote that the restaurant was a "culinary sensation". The restaurant was featured in the Michelin Guide's Bib Gourmand in 2016, 2017, 2018, 2019, and 2021.

References

Restaurants in Singapore
 
Singaporean cuisine